Davit V may refer to:

 Davit V, Caucasian Albanian Catholicos in 923–929
 David V of Georgia, King in 1154–1155
 Catholicos-Patriarch David V of Georgia, ruled in 1972–1977